On June 14, 2017, a mass shooting occurred during a practice session for the annual Congressional Baseball Game in Alexandria, Virginia, where six people were shot, including the then U.S. House Majority Whip, Steve Scalise, U.S. Capitol Police officer Crystal Griner, congressional aide Zack Barth, and lobbyist Matt Mika, by 66-year-old James Hodgkinson. A ten-minute shootout took place between Hodgkinson and officers from the Capitol and Alexandria Police before officers shot Hodgkinson, who died from his wounds later that day at the George Washington University Hospital.  Scalise and Mika were taken to nearby hospitals where they underwent surgery.

Hodgkinson was a far left-wing activist with a record of domestic violence from Belleville, Illinois, while Scalise was a Republican Party member of Congress. The Virginia Attorney General concluded Hodgkinson's attack was "an act of terrorism ... fueled by rage against Republican legislators." Scalise was the first sitting member of Congress to have been shot since Arizona Representative Gabby Giffords in the 2011 Tucson shooting. In a 2021 report, the FBI classified the shooting as an act of domestic terrorism, and the perpetrator of the shooting as a "domestic violent extremist" with a "personalized violent ideology".

Background
The shooting took place on June 14, 2017, at Eugene Simpson Stadium Park in Alexandria, Virginia, across the Potomac River from Washington, D.C. There were 24 Republican congressmen who had gathered at the park to practice for the next day's Congressional Baseball Game for Charity, an annual, bipartisan event first held in 1909. Among those at the practice, aside from Scalise, were Senators Rand Paul and Jeff Flake, and Representatives Roger Williams (the team's coach), Chuck Fleischmann, Trent Kelly, Mo Brooks, Brad Wenstrup, Rodney Davis, Jeff Duncan, Jack Bergman, Mike Bishop and Joe Barton (the team's manager).

Prior to the game, the Republicans had held practices at the same time and place each morning. The team began its practice around 6:30 a.m. EDT that day. According to Representatives Ron DeSantis and Jeff Duncan, they were approached before the shooting at the practice by a man who asked whether Republicans or Democrats were practicing on the field. Duncan reportedly replied that it was the Republican team. DeSantis later told reporters that both he and Duncan believe that the man was the perpetrator of the shooting, James Hodgkinson. Three U.S. Capitol Police officers were present at the practice to protect Scalise, who, due to his House leadership position, had a full-time security detail assigned to protect him. They were posted behind the first-base dugout on that day.

Shooting

The practice had been underway for about half an hour when James Hodgkinson began firing. According to the Capitol Police, he was armed with an SKS rifle and a 9mm Smith & Wesson handgun, both of which he had purchased legally. It was unclear if Hodgkinson used the handgun during the shooting incident. When Hodgkinson opened fire, two of the officers, David Bailey and Crystal Griner, rushed onto the field to protect the congressmen and the other civilians. Hodgkinson sought cover behind the third base dugout as the third Capitol Police officer, Henry Cabrera, took aim at him from behind the first base dugout. At 7:09 am, the Alexandria Police received a 9-1-1 report of shots fired. Two police officers arrived within three minutes and also engaged Hodgkinson in a gunfight. Witnesses estimated between 50 and 100 shots were fired during the shootout, which lasted about 10 minutes before Hodgkinson was mortally wounded by Alexandria Police officers Nicole Battaglia, Alexander Jensen and Kevin Jobe and Capitol Police officers Bailey and Griner.

Scalise, who was at second base when the shooting started, was shot in the hip and tried to drag himself off the field. While the shooting was still going on, Representative Mo Brooks used his belt as a tourniquet to help stop bleeding for a staffer who had been shot in the calf. After the shooting ended, Brooks and Representative Brad Wenstrup—a podiatrist and U.S. Army Reservist who served with the U.S. Army's 344th Combat Support Hospital—were able to assist Scalise. Several witnesses said their lives were saved by the presence of the Capitol Police, who were there because of Scalise's position as the House Majority Whip. The Capitol Police immediately engaged Hodgkinson and kept him pinned down, preventing him from continuing to fire on the unarmed baseball players. Representative Davis and Senator Rand Paul separately said that if not for the presence of the officers, the incident "would have been a massacre".

Injuries

Scalise was shot in the hip and was evacuated by a U.S. Park Police helicopter to MedStar Washington Hospital Center, where he underwent surgery. The hospital reported that after the bullet struck his hip, it traveled across his pelvis—fracturing bones, injuring internal organs, and causing severe bleeding. His condition was initially listed as "critical". He received multiple blood transfusions and underwent several surgeries to repair internal damage and stop the bleeding. His condition was improved to "serious" on June 17. It further improved to "fair" on June 21, though he was readmitted to intensive care on July 5 due to concerns of infection.

Matt Mika, a Tyson Foods lobbyist, was shot multiple times in the chest and arm, injuring his lungs, sternum, and ribs. He is a former baseball player and former legislative assistant for Congressmen Tim Walberg and Dave Camp, both Republicans from Michigan. Paramedics from the Alexandria Fire Department labeled Mika as the most severely wounded, a red case, and he was taken to the George Washington University Hospital via ambulance where he underwent surgery for his injuries. He was in critical condition immediately following surgery. The day after the shooting, his condition was upgraded from critical to serious. On June 23, he was released from the hospital.

David Bailey and Crystal Griner, two of the Capitol Police officers assigned to protect Scalise, were both injured. Griner was shot in the ankle and was hospitalized in what was described as good condition. Bailey was treated and released after sustaining a minor injury not caused by gunfire. Zack Barth, a legislative aide to Representative Roger Williams of Texas, was shot in the calf. He was treated at the hospital and released. Representative Williams, a former Minor League Baseball player and coach of the Republican team, sprained his ankle while jumping into a dugout during the attack to avoid being shot. He used a crutch for support for a few weeks after.

Perpetrator
Police identified the shooter as James Thomas Hodgkinson, 66 years old, whose last permanent residence was in Belleville, Illinois. He was politically active; according to a former attorney of his, he "never did anything violent". He was severely injured in the shootout and transported to the George Washington University Hospital, where he died from his injuries. The sheriff of St. Clair County, Illinois, said that deputies had been called to Hodgkinson's house about half a dozen times in the past 20 years. In 2006, Hodgkinson was accused of beating his foster daughter and charged with domestic battery, but the case was dismissed when the alleged victim decided not to testify. Had Hodgkinson been convicted, he would have been unable to legally purchase firearms.

In March 2017, a neighbor called police to complain about Hodgkinson firing a rifle at trees in their residential neighborhood. The officers who responded checked Hodgkinson's gun permit, then advised him not to shoot in the area but did not conduct an arrest. Hodgkinson owned a home inspection business that had an expired license at the time of the shooting. Investigators believe that he had been living in a van in Alexandria for about six weeks at the time of the shooting. Witnesses say he often parked the van near the ball field and nearby YMCA, and was a frequent visitor to the YMCA. According to Tim Slater of the FBI's Washington, D.C., field office, Hodgkinson was "running out of money. He was not employed at the time of the event, and he was looking for some local employment. He was married for 30 years, and it appears that that marriage was not going very well.  It was just a pattern of life where you could tell things were not going well."

Motives
Hodgkinson had participated in the Bernie Sanders 2016 presidential campaign, and was described by a fellow campaigner in Iowa as a "quiet guy, very mellow, very reserved". Republican Congressman Mike Bost, who represents Hodgkinson's home district, said Hodgkinson had contacted his office ten times but "never with any threats, only anger". He wrote 27 letters to the editor of the Belleville News-Democrat between March 2008 and September 2012 on various political and economic topics, many of which were anti-Republican.

On May 22, 2017, Hodgkinson wrote "Trump is a Traitor. Trump Has Destroyed Our Democracy. It's Time to Destroy Trump & Co." above his repost of a Change.org petition demanding "the legal removal" of Donald Trump and Vice President Mike Pence for "treason". He belonged to numerous political Facebook groups, including those named "Terminate the Republican Party", "The Road To Hell Is Paved With Republicans", and "Donald Trump is not my President."

The Federal Bureau of Investigation (FBI), which took over the investigation, said on June 14 that it was too early to ascribe a motive for the shootings. It put out a request for public assistance with "any information regarding Hodgkinson". On June 16, USA Today reported, citing an anonymous source, that the FBI found a list of names, including those of Republican Congressmen Mo Brooks, Jeff Duncan and Trent Franks, in Hodgkinson's pocket. On June 21, FBI agent Timothy Slater said the names of six congressmen were written on a piece of paper found in an Alexandria storage locker rented to Hodgkinson. He said it did not appear to be a hit list, and that its significance was unclear.

Reactions

The attack drew a bipartisan response as many politicians immediately sent out notes expressing their anger over the shooting, recovery wishes for the injured and gratitude for the police. News of the shooting and injuries quickly reached the Democratic Congressional Baseball players, who were at their own practice at another location when the shooting occurred. They gathered together in the dugout to pray for the injured.

President Trump addressed the nation saying, "We are deeply saddened by this tragedy. Our thoughts and prayers are with the members of Congress, their staffs, Capitol Police, first responders, and all others affected." He and his wife, Melania Trump, visited Scalise and Griner in the hospital. While at the hospital, the Trumps spoke with Scalise's family and with Griner and her wife. On July 27, 2017, Trump awarded the Public Safety Officer Medal of Valor to five of the officers who were injured in the shooting.

Speaker of the House Paul Ryan (R–WI) addressed the U.S. House of Representatives before their afternoon session and said, "An attack on one of us is an attack on all of us." Members of both parties rose in applause to his remarks. Former Representative Gabby Giffords (D–AZ), who survived the 2011 Tucson shooting, sent a tweet that read "My heart is with my former colleagues, their families and staff, and the US Capitol Police—public servants and heroes today and every day."

Hours after the shooting, Senator Bernie Sanders responded on the U.S. Senate floor to news that Hodgkinson was a campaign volunteer for his 2016 U.S. presidential election run:

Reactions to the shooting among political activists were split. Some liberals, such as Virginia governor Terry McAuliffe, called for stricter gun control laws, while some Republicans, such as Chris Collins, blamed anti-Trump rhetoric. Other activists blamed growing national political polarization, as reported by the Pew Research Center, for causing the shooting.

Increased ticket sales

Congressional leaders announced on the afternoon of June 14 that the Congressional Baseball Game, which is played for charity, would take place as scheduled the next day.

The annual game usually attracted a crowd of about 10,000 people, but after the shooting, more than 20,000 tickets were sold, bringing in more than $1 million for charity. David Bailey, one of the two Capitol Police officers injured in the shootout, threw out the first pitch. Relying on crutches because of his injury, he received a standing ovation from the crowd of 24,959 in Nationals Park. Many players of both parties wore Louisiana State University hats with their uniforms as a tribute to Scalise. While the Democratic team defeated the Republican team 11–2, they loaned the trophy to the Republicans until Scalise finished his recovery.

See also
 1954 United States Capitol shooting
 1998 United States Capitol shooting
 2010 Pentagon shooting
 2011 Tucson shooting
 2021 storming of the United States Capitol
 Left-wing terrorism
 List of incidents of political violence in Washington, D.C.
 List of United States Congress members killed or wounded in office
 October 2018 United States mail bombing attempts
 Shooting of Miriam Carey (2013)
 Solomon Peña

References

Further reading

External links
 
 

115th United States Congress
2017 active shooter incidents in the United States
2017 in American politics
2017 in Virginia
2017 mass shootings in the United States
Mass shootings in the United States
Articles containing video clips
Attacks on the United States Congress
Failed assassination attempts in the United States
Attacks in the United States in 2017
Attacks on sports venues
Baseball in Virginia
Far-left terrorism
Hate crimes
History of Alexandria, Virginia
History of baseball in the United States
June 2017 crimes in the United States
Mass shootings in Virginia
Non-fatal shootings
Republican Party (United States)
Shootings in Virginia
Terrorism in the United States
Terrorist incidents in Virginia
Terrorist incidents in the United States in 2017
United States Capitol Police